Diane Delano (born January 29, 1957 in Los Angeles, California) is an American character actress. She is known for her numerous roles in films and television, such as Sergeant Barbara Semanski on the CBS television series Northern Exposure and Roberta "Bobbi" Glass on The WB television series Popular.

Aside from Bobbi Glass and her twin sister Nurse Jessi Glass on Popular, she played the role of Hilda, an FBI agent hired to protect Sami Brady, on Days of Our Lives. She also recently provided the voice for Big Barda in Batman: The Brave and the Bold. Prior to this, she had voiced the superheroine Pantha in Teen Titans.

Filmography

Film

Television

Video games

References

Sources

External links
 
 
 

1957 births
Actresses from Los Angeles
American film actresses
American television actresses
American voice actresses
Living people
21st-century American women